Tariyunnuaq formerly Melville Sound is an Arctic waterway in the Kitikmeot Region, Nunavut, Canada.

It is located south of Kiillinnguyaq, and north of the main part of the Nunavut mainland. To the west it opens into Bathurst Inlet.

References

Sounds of Kitikmeot Region